The United States men's national basketball team won the gold medal at the 2010 FIBA World Championship. The team was an entirely rebuilt squad without a single member from its 2008 Olympic gold-medal team. The 2010 team relied heavily on a small lineup to win its first World Championship since 1994. They were led by 21-year-old Kevin Durant, who was the tournament's most valuable player. The U.S. automatically qualified for the 2012 Olympics in London, and overtook Argentina for the No. 1 world ranking.

Roster
With none of the 2008 Olympians on the roster, the team was derisively called a "B-Team." The team featured six players 22 years old or younger and only one true center in Tyson Chandler. The team was projected to field a powerful inside-oriented team, but contractual issues with Amar'e Stoudemire and an injury to David Lee forced them to withdraw from the team on the opening day of training camp, and Brook Lopez was also unavailable due to injuries.

Preliminary round

Croatia

Slovenia

Brazil

Iran

Tunisia

Final round

Round of 16 – Angola

Quarterfinals – Russia

Semifinals – Lithuania

Final – Turkey

Statistics

References
General

Specific

External links

USA team at FIBA.com

 
2010–11 in American basketball
2010